Chalone may refer to:
Chalone, California, former name of Metz, California
Chalone AVA, American Viticultural Area in Monterey County, California
Chalone, a group of tissue-specific water-soluble substances produced within a tissue and that inhibit mitosis of cells of that tissue and whose action is reversible